Famara Diédhiou (born 15 December 1992) is a Senegalese professional footballer who plays as a striker for Granada CF on loan from Süper Lig club Alanyaspor and Senegal national team.

Club career

Sochaux
Diédhiou joined FC Sochaux-Montbéliard in 2014 from Gazélec Ajaccio. He made his Ligue 2 debut at 2 August 2014 against US Orléans playing the full game in a 0–1 home defeat on the opening day of the 2014–15 season. On 22 August 2014, he scored his first Ligue 2 goal against AC Arles-Avignon.

Loan to Clermont
On 2 February 2015, Diédhiou joined Clermont Foot on loan from Sochaux.  For the 2015–16 Ligue 2 season, he went back on loan to Clermont again. In that season, he scored 22 goals in 37 matches.

Angers
In summer 2016, he moved up a tier joining Ligue 1 club Angers SCO who paid Sochaux a transfer fee of £1.36 million. In 2016–17, his only season at the club, he played 35 times scoring 9 goals.

Bristol City
On 28 June 2017, Diédhiou signed a four-year contract with English Championship club Bristol City for a club record transfer fee of £5.3 million. He scored on his debut for Bristol City in a 3–1 win over Barnsley on 5 August 2017. During the 2017–18 season Bristol City reached the semi finals of the EFL Cup, with Diédhiou scoring in the 2—0 upset against Premier League opponents Stoke City in the third round.

In his first season at the club scoring 14 goals in 36 appearances in all competitions, finishing the club's 2nd top scorer behind Bobby Reid for Bristol City. In May 2018 he received a six-match ban due to a spitting incident in a match against Birmingham City in April 2018. Diédhiou denied the charges, leading the club to appeal the ban on 21 June 2018. Bristol City appealed the 6 match ban, however the decision was upheld on 14 July 2018, meaning Diédhiou was suspended for the opening six matches of the 2018–19 season.

During the 2018/19 season, he scored 13 league goals for the second consecutive season and finished as Bristol City's top scorer with 13 goals in all competitions.

On 23 February 2021, Diédhiou scored a brace at the Riverside Stadium against Middlesbrough F.C. to surpass 50 goals for the club in a 3-1 away victory.

Alanyaspor
On 19 July 2021, Diédhiou signed a four-year contract with Turkish club Alanyaspor.

Granada (loan)
On 24 January 2023, Diédhiou joined Segunda División club Granada CF on loan until the end of the season with the option to buy.

International career
Diédhiou scored his first goal for Senegal in a 2–0 2017 Africa Cup of Nations qualification win over Namibia.
His second international goal came in a friendly vs Brazil, scoring a penalty after Sadio Mane was fouled in the penalty area. Sadio Mane's dazzling pass set him up for his third goal in the African Cup of Nations encounter against Equatorial Guinea.

Career statistics

Club

International
Scores and results list Senegal's goal tally first, score column indicates score after each Diédhiou goal.

Honours
Senegal
 Africa Cup of Nations: 2021

References

Living people
1992 births
Sportspeople from Saint-Louis, Senegal
Association football forwards
Senegalese footballers
Senegal international footballers
2017 Africa Cup of Nations players
2021 Africa Cup of Nations players
2022 FIFA World Cup players
Africa Cup of Nations-winning players
Ligue 1 players
Ligue 2 players
Championnat National players
Championnat National 2 players
English Football League players
Süper Lig players
FC Sochaux-Montbéliard players
Clermont Foot players
ASM Belfort players
Gazélec Ajaccio players
Angers SCO players
Bristol City F.C. players
Alanyaspor footballers
Granada CF footballers
Senegalese expatriate footballers
Senegalese expatriate sportspeople in France
Expatriate footballers in France
Senegalese expatriate sportspeople in England
Expatriate footballers in England
Senegalese expatriate sportspeople in Turkey
Expatriate footballers in Turkey
Senegalese expatriate sportspeople in Spain
Expatriate footballers in Spain